This is a list of schools in the City of London.

State-funded schools

Primary schools 
The Aldgate School (Church of England voluntary aided primary school, Aldgate)

Independent schools

Primary and preparatory schools 
Charterhouse Square School (private primary school, Barbican)
St Paul's Cathedral School (preparatory school, City of London)

Senior and all-through schools 
City of London School (independent boys school, City of London)
City of London School for Girls (independent girls school, City of London)
David Game College (independent school, City of London)

See also
List of former schools in the City of London

Schools in the City of London
City of London
Schools